The National Snow and Ice Data Center (NSIDC) is a United States information and referral center in support of polar and cryospheric research. NSIDC archives and distributes digital and analog snow and ice data and also maintains information about snow cover, avalanches, glaciers, ice sheets, freshwater ice, sea ice, ground ice, permafrost, atmospheric ice, paleoglaciology, and ice cores.

NSIDC is part of the University of Colorado Boulder Cooperative Institute for Research in Environmental Sciences (CIRES), and is affiliated with the National Oceanic and Atmospheric Administration (NOAA) National Centers for Environmental Information through a cooperative agreement. NSIDC serves as one of twelve Distributed Active Archive Centers funded by the National Aeronautics and Space Administration to archive and distribute data from NASA's past and current satellites and field measurement programs. NSIDC also supports the National Science Foundation through the Exchange For Local Observations and Knowledge of the Arctic (ELOKA) and other scientific research grants. NSIDC is also a member of the ICSU World Data System. Mark Serreze is the director of NSIDC.

History
The World Data Center (WDC) for Glaciology, Boulder, a data center responsible for archiving all available glaciological information, was established at the American Geographical Society under Dr. William O. Field, Director, in 1957. Between 1971 and 1976 it was operated by the U.S. Geological Survey, Glaciology Project Office, under the direction of Dr. Mark F. Meier.

In 1976, responsibility for the WDC for Glaciology was transferred to NOAA, Environmental Data and Information Service (EDIS), and the center moved to the University of Colorado at Boulder under the direction of Professor Roger G. Barry. In 1982, NOAA created the National Snow and Ice Data Center (NSIDC) as a means to expand the WDC holdings and as a place to archive data from some NOAA programs. In the 1980s and 1990s, support to NSIDC widened with NASA funding for the Snow and Ice Distributed Active Archive Center (DAAC) and NSF funding to manage selected Arctic and Antarctic data and metadata.

Milestones
 1957-58: First International Geophysical Year
 1957: U.S. National Committee for the IGY awards the operation of WDC-A for Glaciology to the American Geographical Society
 1970: WDC for Glaciology transfers from the American Geographical Society to the U.S. Geological Survey in Tacoma, Washington
 1976: WDC for Glaciology transfers from the U.S. Geological Survey in Tacoma, Washington to the University of Colorado at Boulder, Colorado under the direction of Roger Barry
 1982: NOAA designates the National Snow and Ice Data Center
 1983: NSIDC receives grant from NASA for archiving Nimbus 7 passive microwave data
 1990: NSIDC receives funding from NSF for Arctic System Science (ARCSS) Data Coordination Center (ADCC)
 1993: NSIDC receives first DAAC contract
 1996: Antarctic Data Coordination Center (ADCC) established with NSF support
 1999: Antarctic Glaciological Data Center (AGDC) established with NSF support
 2001: NSIDC celebrates its 25th Anniversary
 2002: Frozen Ground Data Center established with International Arctic Research Center (IARC) support
 2003: Full suite of Earth Observing System (EOS) cryospheric sensors (AMSR, GLAS, MODIS) in orbit
 2009: Mark Serreze named NSIDC director

International interactions
International science and data management programs facilitate the free exchange of data and accelerate research aimed at understanding the role of the cryosphere in the Earth system. NSIDC contributes to a number of international programs. Most of these programs, only a few of which are mentioned here, fall under the aegis of the International Council of Scientific Unions (ICSU).

NSIDC scientists participate in International Union of Geodesy and Geophysics (IUGG), International Association of Cryospheric Sciences (IACS), and in activities of the International Permafrost Association (IPA), the Global Digital Sea Ice Data Bank (GDSIDB), and the World Climate Research Programme (WCRP), including Climate and Cryosphere (CliC), Global Energy and Water Cycle Experiment (GEWEX), the Global Climate Observing System (GCOS), and the Global Earth Observation System of Systems (GEOSS). Former NSIDC Director, Roger G. Barry, was co-Vice Chair of the WCRP CliC Scientific Steering Group until 2005, and was a member of the GCOS/Global Terrestrial Observing System (GTOS) Terrestrial Observation Panel for Climate through 2007.

Research
Researchers at NSIDC investigate the dynamics of Antarctic ice shelves, new techniques for the remote sensing of snow and freeze/thaw cycle of soils, the role of snow in hydrologic modeling, linkages between changes in sea ice extent and weather patterns, large-scale shifts in polar climate, river and lake ice, and the distribution and characteristics of seasonally and permanently frozen ground. In-house scientists pursue their work as part of the CIRES Cryospheric and Polar Process Division, 
University of Colorado Boulder.

NSIDC also monitors Arctic and Antarctic sea ice in near real time, and regularly posts sea ice extent data and analysis on its Arctic Sea Ice News and Analysis page.

Local and traditional knowledge
A research project of the NSIDC is the Exchange For Local Observations and Knowledge of the Arctic or ELOKA.   It is a collaborative international effort that was launched during the 2007–2009 International Polar Year.  ELOKA facilitates the collection, preservation, exchange, and use of local observations and knowledge of the Arctic. Data management and user support are provided by ELOKA while it fosters collaboration between resident Arctic experts and visiting researchers. By working together, Arctic residents and researchers have made significant contributions to our understanding of the Arctic and recent changes to it.  A key challenge of local and traditional knowledge (LTK) research and community-based monitoring is having an effective and appropriate means of recording, storing, and managing data and information. There is also the issue of finding an effective means of making such data available to Arctic residents and researchers, as well as other interested groups such as teachers, students, and decision makers. Without a network and data management system to support LTK and community-based research, a number of problems have arisen.  ELOKA aims to fill this gap.

See also
CIRES
Distributed Active Archive Centers
Earth Observing System
Antarctic ice pack
Arctic ice pack
University of Colorado at Boulder

References

Further reading
US National Research Council (1983) Snow and Ice Research: An Assessment US National Academies Press pg 115
US National Research Council (1995) Study on the Long-term Retention of Selected Scientific and Technical Records of the Federal Government US National Academies Press pg 115
Minster, J./NRC (1998) Review of NASA's Distributed Active Archive Centers US National Academies Press  pp 147–163
Simpson, Robert in Oliver, John E. (ed) (2005) The Encyclopedia of World Climatology Springer   pg 232
Burden, Paul R. (2010) A Subject Guide to Quality Web Sites Scarecrow Press  pg 626
Barry, Roger and Gan, Thian Yew (2011) The Global Cryosphere: Past, Present and Future Cambridge University Press  pg 5

External links 
 NSIDC main page
 NSIDC Arctic Sea Ice News & Analysis
 Icelights, a regular column by cryosphere experts and questions from the public
 Serious Science, an interview with NSIDC lead scientist Ted Scambos from The Antarctic Sun

Glaciology of the United States
Earth sciences organizations
Snow and Ice Data Center
Scientific organizations based in the United States
Organizations established in 1957
1957 establishments in Colorado